Ctenucha multifaria is a moth of the family Erebidae. It was described by Francis Walker in 1854. It is found in the US states of California and western Oregon.

The wingspan is 46–50 mm.

References

multifaria
Moths described in 1854